"Let There Be Light" is a single by musician Mike Oldfield, released in 1995. It is from the album The Songs of Distant Earth and uses audio from the Apollo 8 space mission. For the intro, the single uses the Apollo 8 Genesis reading.

Charts 
It charted at number 51 on the UK Singles Chart on 2 September 1995.

Music video 
The second pressing of the enhanced CD album (one of the first enhanced CDs) contains the full version of the "Let There Be Light" video. Footage from the "Let There Be Light" music video also appeared in the BBC science fiction documentary series Future Fantastic. The music video was directed by Howard Greenhalgh.

Track listing

UK CD 1 
 "Let There Be Light" (Mike Oldfield)
 "Let There Be Light" (BT's Pure Luminescence Remix) (Mike Oldfield)
 "Let There Be Light" (The Ultraviolet Mix) (Mike Oldfield)
 "Let There Be Light" (Hardfloor Remix) (Mike Oldfield)

UK CD 2 
 "Let There Be Light" (Mike Oldfield)
 "Indian Lake" (Mike Oldfield)
 "Let There Be Light" (BT's Entropic Dub) (Mike Oldfield)

USA CD 
 "Let There Be Light" (Mike Oldfield)
 "Let There Be Light" (BT's Pure Luminescence Remix) (Mike Oldfield)
 "Let There Be Light" (The Ultraviolet Mix) (Mike Oldfield)
 "Let There Be Light" (Hardfloor Remix) (Mike Oldfield)
 "Let There Be Light" (Hardfloor Dub) (Mike Oldfield)
 "Let There Be Light" (BT's Entropic Dub) (Mike Oldfield)

References 

 

1995 singles
Mike Oldfield songs
Songs about outer space
Songs written by Mike Oldfield
Warner Music Group singles
Music videos directed by Howard Greenhalgh